The University of Virginia School of Engineering and Applied Science (SEAS), is the undergraduate and graduate engineering school of the University of Virginia. Established in 1836, the school is the oldest university engineering school in United States, and oldest engineering school in the Southern United States.

One of 12 schools and colleges at the University of Virginia, the school is home to eight departments: Biomedical Engineering, Chemical Engineering, Computer Science, Electrical and Computer Engineering, Engineering and Society, Engineering Systems and Environment, Materials Science and Engineering and Mechanical and Aerospace Engineering.

History

In 1836, the Board of Visitors made civil engineering a formal course of study at the University of Virginia. At the time, there were just three institutions of higher learning in the U.S. wholly devoted to engineering instruction. With its 1836 resolution, the University of Virginia became the first enduring engineering program established in the South and the first in the nation at a comprehensive university.

In 2012, the Engineering School established the Department of Engineering and Society (E&S). Along with providing many of the foundational courses in the School's curriculum, E&S is responsible for the following programs for undergraduates: the undergraduate thesis, the engineering business minor, the Washington, D.C. Science and Technology Policy Internship, Rodman Scholars, international studies, online courses, and hands-on activities such as the electric vehicle project.

Starting in 2015, a SEAS team led by mechanical engineering professor Eric Loth began research into a UVA design of offshore wind turbines that would potentially dwarf the size and scope of any being produced or researched anywhere else. The innovative design inspired by palm trees led to Roth being named to a Popular Science list of “The Brilliant Minds Behind The New Energy Revolution” in June of that year.

In 2018 and 2019, SEAS teams consisting of computer science undergraduates twice won the Alamo Cup and repeat national championships at the National Collegiate Cyber Defense Competition. This is the best known collegiate information security competition in the United States, and the University of Virginia won the 2019 competition over 235 competing universities.

Special Scholars and Societies

Clark Scholars Program
The A. James Clark Scholars Program was established in 2018 as the result of a $15 million gift from the A. James and Alice B. Clark Foundation in 2017. Clark Scholars are selected from underserved demographics for their academic excellence, track record of leadership, and commitment to community service. The inaugural cohort of 16, led in the 2018-2019 school year by Stephanie Gernentz, Joshua Arul, and Rachel Zhang, entered in June 2018.

Rodman Scholars Program
The Rodman Scholars Program, founded in 1979, consists of the top 5-6 percent of each class of engineering students.

The Society of P.R.I. 
One of the many secret societies at U.Va., The Society of P.R.I. is exclusive to the SEAS community. It is known for honoring faculty, staff, and students for exceptional service to their respective communities.

Departments and Degree Programs

There are eight departments home to eleven degree programs.

Biomedical Engineering
Chemical Engineering
Computer Science
Electrical and Computer Engineering
Engineering and Society
Engineering Systems and Environment
Materials Science and Engineering
Mechanical and Aerospace Engineering

Undergraduate students at the U.Va. Engineering School may minor in applied math, engineering business, the history of science and technology, materials science and engineering, science and technology policy, technology and the environment, technology leaders and any variety of studies within the College of Arts & Sciences.

The School offers four online and collaborative programs: the Accelerated master's degree in Systems Engineering, the Commonwealth Graduate Engineering Program, Engineers PRODUCED in Virginia and the MBA/ME Program.

Centers and Institutes
Listed are the Centers and Institutes associated with the School of Engineering and Applied Science:

 Center for Advanced Biomanufacturing
 Center for Applied Biomechanics
 Center for Automata Processing
 Center for Electrochemical Science and Engineering
 Center for Research in Intelligent Storage and Processing in Memory
 Center for Risk Management of Engineering Systems
 Center for Transportation Studies
 Center for Visual and Decision Informatics
 Commonwealth Center for Advanced Logistics Systems (CCALS)
 Commonwealth Center for Advanced Manufacturing (CCAM)
 Environmental Resilience Institute
 Global Infectious Diseases Institute
 nanoSTAR Institute
 NSF I/UCRC Center for Laser & Plasma For Advanced Manufacturing (LAM)
 Mid-Atlantic Transportation Sustainability University Transportation Center (MATS UTC)
 Multi-Functional Integrated System Technology (MIST) Center
 NSF Nanosystems Engineering Research Center for Advanced Self-Powered Systems of Integrated Sensors and Technologies (ASSIST)
 Rolls-Royce University Technology Center
 Virginia Center for Grid Research
 UVA Center for Wireless Health

Undergraduate Research Journal

Founded in 2009 and first issue published in April 2010, The Spectra: The Virginia Engineering and Science Research Journal, is a peer reviewed undergraduate research journal published by the U.Va. School of Engineering and Applied Sciences.

References

External links
The School of Engineering & Applied Science at the University of Virginia
The Rodman Scholars Program

Virginia
Engineering universities and colleges in Virginia
Engineering and Applied Science, School of
Educational institutions established in 1836
1836 establishments in Virginia